Syracuse is a city in Davis County, Utah, United States. It is part of the Ogden–Clearfield, Utah Metropolitan Statistical Area. The city has seen rapid growth and development since the 1990s. The city population was 24,331 at the time of the 2010 census, an increase of 158.9% since the 2000 census.

While settlers have populated the area since the mid 1800s, Syracuse was incorporated on September 3, 1935. The city was named by early settlers for Syracuse, New York, which was famed for its salt production in the 19th century.

Geography
The city is located in northern Davis County on the eastern side of the Great Salt Lake. It is bordered to the north by West Point, to the northeast and east by Clearfield, and to the southeast by Layton. A causeway on SR 127 connects Syracuse to Antelope Island State Park in the Great Salt Lake.

Climate
According to the Köppen climate classification, Syracuse experiences either a Mediterranean climate (Csa) or a dry-summer continental climate (Dsa) depending on which variant of the system is used. Summers are hot and relatively dry, with highs frequently reaching , with a few days per year reaching . Rain is provided in the form of infrequent thunderstorms during summer, usually between late July and mid-September during the height of monsoon season. The Pacific storm season usually lasts from about October through May, with precipitation reaching its peak in spring. Snow usually first occurs in late October or early November, with the last occurring sometime in April. Winters are cool and snowy, with highs averaging  in January.

Demographics

As of the census of 2010, there were 24,331 people, and 6,362 households residing in the city. The population density was 2,793.46 people per square mile (1,736.69/km2). There were 6,534 housing units at an average density of 298.6 per square mile (115.3/km2). The racial makeup of the city was 94.6% White, 2.9% Asian, 1.2% African American, 0.7% Native American, 0.6% Pacific Islander, 2.7% from other races. Hispanic or Latino of any race were 6% of the population.

There were 6,362 households, out of which 42.0% (2010) had children under the age of 18 living with them, 83.3% (2000) were married couples living together, 5.4% (2000) had a female householder with no husband present, and 9.1% (2000) were non-families. 7.1% (2000) of all households were made up of individuals, and 2.2% (2000) had someone living alone who was 65 years of age or older. The average household size was 3.81 (2010) and the average family size was 4.02 (2010).

The median age was 26.5 years (2010). For every 100 females, there were 102.56 males (2010). For every 100 females age 18 and over, there were 101.4 males (2000).

The median income for a household in the city was $58,223 (2000), and the median income for a family was $60,000 (2000). Males had a median income of $41,346 (2000) versus $24,792 (2000) for females. The per capita income for the city was $16,989 (2000). About 2.1% (2000) of families and 2.4% (2000) of the population were below the poverty line, including 2.9% (2000) of those under age 18 and 6.5% (2000) of those age 65 or over.

Schools
 Syracuse Elementary
 Bluff Ridge Elementary
 Cook Elementary
 Buffalo Point Elementary
 Syracuse Arts Academy (elementary charter school)
 Syracuse Arts Academy Junior High (junior high counterpart to the elementary Arts Academy)
 Syracuse Jr. High School
 Syracuse High School
 Island View Residential Treatment Center

References

External links

 
 Syracuse history, from the city website
 Local Syracuse, Utah Weather, live weather data provided by a personal weather station located in the Hansen Meadows subdivision.

Cities in Davis County, Utah
Cities in Utah
Ogden–Clearfield metropolitan area
Populated places established in 1878